First Light is the fourth album by folk rock duo Richard and Linda Thompson. It was released in 1978 on Chrysalis Records.

Writing and recording 
After the release of their third album, Pour Down Like Silver, the Thompsons took an extended break from music. They spent much of the next three years living in sufi communes in London and Norfolk.

This prolonged sabbatical was punctuated by occasional session work by Richard Thompson and a short tour in 1977 in which the duo performed mostly new, overtly religious material and were backed by musicians who were also practitioners of the Sufi faith.

In 1978 Richard Thompson accepted an invitation from Joe Boyd to play on Julie Covington's eponymous solo debut album. The musicians hired for this album included highly regarded American session players Neil Larsen, Willie Weeks and Andy Newmark, who had also been working in the studio with George Harrison. According to Boyd the three Americans were hugely impressed by Thompson's playing and expressed a wish to work with him. Boyd also knew that Thompson had some new material and talked Thompson's manager Jo Lustig into taking advantage of the situation: "The material is there and these guys love Richard, they’re gonna kill to play with him. It would be great."

The resulting First Light was the fourth album by Richard and Linda Thompson and marked their resumption of their recording career. It is dominated by spiritual songs, some of them direct translations of sufi and koranic texts.

In later years Thompson expressed dissatisfaction with his recorded output in the late 1970s: "The regrets I would have would be career stuff, I was too flaccid in the 1970s, I just wasn’t thinking tightly enough to make a difference. Especially the later 70s, where I made really indifferent records, I just didn’t have my mind on the job."

Track listing
All songs written by Richard Thompson; except "Pavanne" by Richard and Linda Thompson, and "The Choice Wife" traditional, arranged by Richard Thompson
Side one
 "Restless Highway"  – 3:52
 "Sweet Surrender"  – 4:40
 "Don't Let a Thief Steal Into Your Heart"  – 4:38
 "The Choice Wife"  – 2:30
 "Died for Love"  – 6:30
Side two
 "Strange Affair"  – 3:05
 "Layla"  – 4:17
 "Pavanne"  – 5:00
 "House of Cards"  – 3:24
 "First Light"  – 4:17

Personnel
Richard Thompson – guitar, vocals, mandolin, dulcimer, whistle, guitar synthesizer
Linda Thompson – vocals
Andy Newmark – drums
Willie Weeks  – bass guitar
Neil Larsen – keyboards
John Kirkpatrick  – accordion
Chris Karen – percussion
Dave Mattacks – percussion
Dolores Keane – whistle
Dave Brady, Heather Brady, Dave Burland, Bill Caddick, Philippa Clare, Julie Covington, Andy Fairweather Low, Trevor Lucas, Iain Matthews, Maddy Prior and Peta Webb – background vocals

References 

1978 albums
Richard and Linda Thompson albums
Chrysalis Records albums
Albums produced by John Wood (record producer)